Newly created taxonomic names in biological nomenclature often reflect the discoverer's interests or honour those the discoverer holds in esteem. This is a list of real organisms with scientific names chosen to reference the fictional Star Wars series created by George Lucas.

Named after Darth Vader

Named after Yoda

Named after Chewbacca

Named after Luke Skywalker

Named after Han Solo

Named after Padmé Amidala

Named after Porgs

Named after other characters and elements

Named after Star Wars actors

See also 
 List of unusual biological names
 List of organisms named after works of fiction
 List of organisms named after famous people

References 

Star Wars
organisms